NGC 408 is a star located in the constellation Pisces. It was discovered on October 22, 1867 by Herman Schultz. It was described by Dreyer as "very faint, very small, (WH) II 220 eight seconds of time to east.", WH II 220 being NGC 410.

See also 
 List of NGC objects (1–1000)
 Pisces (constellation)

References

External links 
 
 
 SEDS

0408
18671022
Pisces (constellation)
Discoveries by Herman Schultz (astronomer)